Secretary to the Government of the Federation is the official title of the political appointee responsible for ensuring the effective coordination and monitoring of the implementation of government policies and programmes in the hierarchy of Nigerian government.

Offices of the Secretary of the Government of the Federation
The following are the cabinets for the effective discharge of duties by the secretary

 General Services Office
 Political Affairs Office
 Economic Affairs Office
 Special Services Office
 Special Duties Office

Secretaries
Boss Gida Mustapha (01/11/2017 - present)
Babachir David Lawal (27/08/2015 - 29/10/2017)
Ogbonnaya Onu (01/06/2015  - 27/08/2015)
Anyim Pius Anyim (01/05/2011 - 29/05/2015)
Yayale Ahmed (08/10/2008 - 29/05/2011)
Baba Gana Kingibe (29/05/2007 - 08/10/2008)
Ufot Ekaette (29/05/1999 - 28/05/2007)
Gidado Idris (17/10/1995 - 28/05/1999)
Aminu Saleh (18/11/1993 - 17/10/1995)
Mustafa Umara (27/08/1993 - 17/11/1993)
Aliyu Mohammed (01/01/1990 - 26/08/1993)
Olu Falae (31/01/1986 - 31/12/1989)
G. A. Longe (01/01/1984 - 30/01/1986)
Shehu Ahmadu Musa (01/10/1979 - 31/12/1983)
Alli L. Ciroma (01/04/1977 - 30/09/1979)
A. A. Ayida (23/04/1975 - 31/03/1977)
C. O. Lawson (16/08/1972 - 31/03/1975)
A. A. Atta (21/12/1970 - 12/06/1972)
M. A. Ejueyitchie (04/08/1966 - 20/12/1970)
Dr. S. O. Wey (01/09/1961 - 16/01/1966)

References

Government of Nigeria